Kurt Liander (28 January 1932 – 10 March 2020) was a Swedish footballer and football manager.

He played mostly for AIK and IFK Stockholm.

He played 5 times for the Swedish national team.

He also had a career as a manager.

References

External links
Profile

1932 births
2020 deaths
Swedish footballers
Sweden international footballers
AIK Fotboll players
IFK Stockholm players
BKV Norrtälje players
Swedish football managers
AIK Fotboll managers
Association football midfielders
Footballers from Stockholm